The Crown Film Unit was an organisation within the British Government's Ministry of Information during the Second World War; until 1940, it was the GPO Film Unit. Its remit was to make films for the general public in Britain and abroad. Its output included short information and documentary films, as well as longer drama-documentaries, as well as a few straight drama productions.

Music was an important element. The conductor Muir Mathieson was the director of music for many productions, and notable composers commissioned to write original scores included Walter Leigh, Benjamin Britten, Ernst Meyer, Richard Addinsell, Benjamin Frankel, Christian Darnton, Guy Warrack and Arthur Benjamin.

The Crown Film Unit continued to produce films, as part of the Central Office of Information (COI), until it was disbanded in 1952.

Notable productions

References

External links

Film production companies of the United Kingdom
Propaganda film units
State-owned film companies
1940 establishments in the United Kingdom
1952 disestablishments in the United Kingdom
Organizations established in 1940
Organizations disestablished in 1952